Rosser is a rural municipality (RM) in the Canadian province of Manitoba, lying adjacent to the northwest side of Winnipeg and part of the Winnipeg Metro Region. Its population as of the 2016 Census was 1,372.

It is situated along Provincial Trunk Highway 6, and Winnipeg's Perimeter Highway. CentrePort Canada lies primarily in the eastern part of the RM, inside the Perimeter Highway. A small portion of Winnipeg James Armstrong Richardson International Airport also lies within the RM of Rosser.

Water services are provided by the Cartier Regional Water Cooperative. The CentrePort distribution line serves CentrePort development and the RM of Rosser. Water sourced from the Assiniboine River is treated at Headingley before being sent out thru distribution channels. Near the community of Rosser is the Dorsey Converter Station and the large static inverter plant for the Nelson River Bipole HVDC power transmission project.

Communities 
The following communities lie within the RM:

 Gordon
 Grosse Isle
 Lilyfield
 Marquette
 Meadows
 Rosser

Demographics 

As of 2004, a handful of elderly Old Swedish (gammalsvenska) speakers remain. They are the descendents of ethnically Swedish people who moved to Manitoba from Gammalsvenskby, Ukraine, in the early 1900s. Old Swedish derives from the Estonian Swedish dialect of the late 1700s as spoken on the island of Dagö (Hiiumaa). While rooted in Swedish, the dialect shows influence and borrowings from Estonian, German, Russian, and Ukrainian.

Attractions 
 CentrePort Canada — lies primarily in the eastern part of the RM of Rosser
 Little Mountain Park
 Prairie Dog Central Railway — travels through the RM of Rosser
 Six Pines Ranch — agritourism farm
 Winnipeg James Armstrong Richardson International Airport — partially lies within the RM of Rosser.

Further reading 

 Gazetteer of Canada - Manitoba, 4th Edition, Natural Resources Canada, Ottawa 1994

References

External links
 Rural Municipality of Rosser

Rosser

Rosser